No. 608 (North Riding) Squadron was an Auxiliary Air Force squadron of the Royal Air Force during the Second World War. It flew during its existence as a bomber, fighter and reconnaissance unit and was the only RAF squadron to be equipped with the unsuccessful Blackburn Botha torpedo bomber.

History

Formation and early years: Wapitis and Demons

No. 608 Squadron was formed at Thornaby-on-Tees, North Yorkshire as No. 608 County of York (North Riding) Squadron, on 17 March 1930 as a day bomber squadron within the Auxiliary Air Force. Its initial equipment was the Avro 504 N and Westland Wapiti, which the squadron flew until they were replaced with Hawker Demon fighters in January 1937, when the squadrons role was changed to that of a fighter squadron. In May 1937 the name of the squadron was changed to No. 608 (North Riding) Squadron. Shortly before the Second World War broke out, on 20 March 1939, the squadron's role was changed yet again, now into that of a general reconnaissance unit flying under RAF Coastal Command and they were re-equipped for that role with Avro Ansons.

Second World War

Reconnaissance with Ansons, Bothas, Blenheims and Hudsons

The squadron started the war flying the Anson. In June 1940, it began the process of transferring to the Blackburn Botha torpedo bomber. These were found to be unsatisfactory, and by December 1940 the squadron was using its Avro Ansons. These soldiered on until February 1941, when Bristol Blenheim Mk.IVs arrived. However, these were soon replaced by Lockheed Hudsons, which the squadron flew from bases in Scotland, North Africa and Italy until 31 July 1944, when it was disbanded at Pomigliano, Italy.

Pathfinding with Mosquitos
The squadron was reformed on 1 August 1944 at RAF Downham Market, Norfolk as a Mosquito squadron in No 8 (Pathfinder) Groups Light Night Striking Force. It continued to fly in this role, carrying out night attacks on Germany. On 2 May 1945, a Mosquito from 608 squadron dropped a 4,000lb bomb on the naval port at Kiel. It was the last British bombing raid of the war against Nazi Germany.

It disbanded on 28 August 1945 at Downham Market.

Post-war reformation: Mosquitos, Spitfires and Vampires
No. 608 squadron was reformed on 10 May 1946 at Thornaby in its original role as a light bomber squadron in the Royal Auxiliary Air Force. It had however no operational aircraft before being redesignated as a night fighter unit in July 1947, when it received Mosquito NF.30s. These were flown until the squadron changed role yet again, this time to that of a day fighter squadron, receiving Spitfire F.22s in May 1948. From December 1949 these were gradually replaced with de Havilland Vampires, which the squadron flew until, along with all the flying units of the RAuxAF, it was disbanded on 10 March 1957.

Aircraft operated

Squadron bases

Commanding officers

References

Notes

Bibliography

External links
 Squadron history on MOD site
 Squadron histories for nos. 605–610 sqn of RafWeb's Air of Authority
 BBC WW2 People's War-608 sqn 1
 BBC WW2 People's War-608 sqn 2

No. 608
608 Squadron
Military units and formations established in 1930